Girls' Generation 1979 is a South Korean television series based on the 2009 novel of the same name by Kim Yong-hee. The drama slated for eight episodes with 1970s Daegu as the backdrop. It premiered on KBS2 on September 11, 2017, and aired every Monday and Tuesday at 22:00 (KST).

Synopsis
Lee Jung-hee is the second daughter of a family who owns a lingerie factory. She leads a group of teenage girls who have chaotic adventures together. She meets Bae Dong-moon through a group date and Dong-moon immediately falls for her. However, Jung-hee has a crush on Son Jin who is a cute looking senior student of a boys school and begins to follow him around to attract his attention.

One day, Park Hye-joo, a transfer student from Seoul, joins their class and becomes the center of attention, creating jealousy and friction among the heroine and her friends. Despite Jung-hee's attention, Son Jin is attracted to Hye-joo. However, Hye-joo has no romantic feelings for Son Jin as she is interested in Joo Young-choon, an ex-gangster now turned local handy-man.

It's the story of their growing friendship, as the heroine and the new girl starts to bond despite their initial rivalry.

There is also a darker side to the story, with a mystery surrounding an increasing number of sexual assaults in the city. And at the local toy factory, female workers begin disappearing one by one.

Cast

Main
 Bona as Lee Jung-hee
 A girl who is a late bloomer that has a crush on a senior boy from a neighbourhood school.
Chae Seo-jin as Park Hye-joo
A girl who transferred from Seoul with her father. She is a smart, mature, kindhearted and a pretty girl who is the neighbour of Lee Jung-hee and happens to be in the same class as her in school. She immediately gets the attention of the neighbourhood boys.
 Seo Young-joo as Bae Dong-moon
 A typical nerd who is head over heels for Lee Jung-hee and does his best to win her heart.
 Lee Jong-hyun as Joo Young-choon
 A former gangster who turned out to be a kindhearted and a reliable handyman in the neighbourhood. He is a hard-worker who does multiple jobs in a local pharmacy, also as a carpenter, mover and a technician to look after his young sister. 
 Yeo Hoe-hyun as Son Jin
 The popular, cute and handsome guy in town who is the dream guy for many girls at that time. He is the only son of a high-ranking police officer. Despite being the centre of attention of many girls, he has an unrequited crush for Park Hye-joo.
 Min Do-hee as Shim Ae-sook
 A bully who is rebellious in school that has family problems.

Supporting

Jung-hee's family
 Kwon Hae-hyo as Jung-hee's father
 Kim Sun-young as Jung-hee's mother
 Park Ha-na as Hong Do-hwa, Jung-hee's aunt
 Jo Byeong-kyu as Lee Bong-soo, Jung-hee's brother

Junghyeon Girls' High School
 In Gyo-jin as Oh Man-sang, Maths teacher 
 Kim Jae-hwa as drill instructor
 Baek Eun-kyung as Jun Hyun-hee
 Bang Su-jin as Kim Eon-joo
 Seo Ye-seul as Soh Eun-ja
 Kim Su-hyeon as Kim Ki-ryeo
 Lee Bom as Park Gwi-ja 
 Jo Mi-nyeo as Han Ma-eun

Others
 Ahn Bo-hyun as Young-choon's friend
 Jo Duk-hyun as Hye-joo's father
 Han Geu-rim as Unni #3
 Jo Ah-in as Joo Aeng-cho, Young-choon's sister
 Lee Chae-kyung as Son Jin's mother

Production
The first script reading meeting of the cast was held on August 18, 2017, at KBS Annex Building in Yeouido, Seoul.

Original soundtrack

Part 1

Part 2

Ratings
 In this table,  represent the lowest ratings and  represent the highest ratings.
 NR denotes that the drama did not rank in the top 20 daily programs on that date.

Awards and nominations

References

External links
  
 
 

2017 South Korean television series debuts
Korean Broadcasting System television dramas
Korean-language television shows
Television series by Signal Entertainment Group
South Korean teen dramas
South Korean mystery television series
Television shows based on South Korean novels
2017 South Korean television series endings
Television series by SM Life Design Group
Television shows set in Daegu